State Highway 294 (SH 294) is a Texas state highway running from U.S. Highway 79 and U.S. Highway 84 east to Alto.  The route was designated on September 26, 1939 along its current route, replacing part of State Highway 7.

Route description
SH 294 begins at an intersection with U.S. Route 79 and U.S. Route 84 in far southwestern Anderson County and proceeds to the east through agricultural and forested areas.  The route intersects U.S. Route 287 and State Highway 19 in the town of Elkhart, and follows US 287 and TX 19 to the southeast towards Crockett.  Just southeast of town, the route splits from US 287 and TX 19 and continues to the east through the southern portion of Anderson County.  The route then crosses the Neches River into Cherokee County.  It then continues through the southwest section of the county before reaching its terminus at State Highway 21 in Alto.

History
The path on which SH 294 is routed was originally slated to be an eastward extension of State Highway 7 as early as 1933. On September 26, 1939, SH 7 had been rerouted across a number of already built routes further to the south.  A few section of the original route had already been built, including the bridge across the Neches River, so the remaining section of the original route that weren't already assigned were assigned the new moniker of SH 294.

Major junctions

References

Transportation in Anderson County, Texas
Transportation in Cherokee County, Texas
294